New York State Route 100B (NY 100B) is a  spur route of NY 100 in Westchester County, New York, in the United States. The route follows Dobbs Ferry Road across the southern part of the town of Greenburgh, connecting NY 9A to NY 119. NY 100B was assigned in the late 1930s.

Route description

NY 100B begins at an intersection with NY 9A (Saw Mill River Road) in the town of Greenburgh, right next to the New York State Thruway (I-87). Known as Dobbs Ferry Road, NY 100B proceeds northeast through Greenburgh as a two-lane residential street, passing the local Ferncliff Cemetery and bending east into a junction with Park Avenue. Crossing east through Greenburgh, the route crosses south of the Elmwood Country Club. At the east end of the country club, NY 100B crosses into an interchange with the Sprain Brook Parkway. After the Sprain, the route continues east through Greenburgh, passing more residences and entering an intersection with NY 100A (West Hartsdale Road / Knollwood Road). 

After NY 100A, NY 100B turns northeast in front of the Metropolis Country Club, remaining the two-lane residential street through Greenburgh. Passing south of a large strip mall, the route crosses into a junction with NY 119 (Tarrytown Road) in the center of Greenburgh. The right-of-way for NY 100B merges into NY 119, marking the eastern terminus of NY 100B.

History
The easternmost mile (1.6 km) of NY 100B was originally part of Route 2, an unsigned legislative route assigned by the New York State Legislature in 1908. The route began at the New York City line in Yonkers and went north through the eastern Hudson Valley to Valatie, where it ended at Route 1. Route 2 continued south from Dobbs Ferry Road on modern NY 100A and north on what is now NY 119. The Dobbs Ferry Road section of Route 2 was improved to state highway standards as part of a contract awarded by the state of New York on June 26, 1912, and added to the state highway system six months later on December 27. Although the portion of Dobbs Ferry Road east of NY 100A was state-maintained, it did not receive a posted route number until the late 1930s when it was designated as part of NY 100B, a new route continuing west of NY 100A to connect to Saw Mill River Road (NY 9A). The alignment of the route has not been changed since that time.

Major intersections

See also

References

External links

100B
Transportation in Westchester County, New York